Lazard Capital Markets is an American New York-based full-service broker dealer founded in 2005 in a spin-off from its parent Lazard.  

Lazard Capital Markets focuses its activities on equity research, sales and trading; fixed-income and convertible bond sales and trading; and securities underwriting.  The firm maintains a business alliance agreement with Lazard that provides for the continuation of certain historical business relationships including origination of transactions.

External links
Lazard Capital Markets website

Investment banks in the United States
American companies established in 2005
Financial services companies established in 2005
Banks established in 2005